Cethegus may refer to:
 Cethegus (spider), a spider genus
 Cornelii Cethegi, an ancient Roman family
 Rufius Petronius Nicomachus Cethegus, Roman senator